Betty Jane Fritz (October 14, 1924 – August 11, 1994) was a center fielder who played in the All-American Girls Professional Baseball League during the  season.

Born in Oshkosh, Wisconsin, Fritz was one of the sixty founding members of the All-American Girls Professional Baseball League. A good-hitting outfielder, she played one season for the Rockford Peaches, a team managed by Eddie Stumpf. She batted a .210 average and tied for eighth in the league for the most runs batted in (43). Besides this, she tied Betsy Jochum of the South Bend Blue Sox for the most outfield assists (17), being surpassed only by Racine Belles' Eleanor Dapkus (19).

Career statistics
Batting

Fielding

Sources

All-American Girls Professional Baseball League players
Rockford Peaches players
Baseball players from Wisconsin
Sportspeople from Oshkosh, Wisconsin
1924 births
1994 deaths
20th-century American women
20th-century American people